Margaret of Norway may refer to:
 Margaret of Scotland, Queen of Norway (1261-1283)
 Margaret, Maid of Norway (1283–1290), disputed queen regnant of Scots
 Margaret I of Denmark (1353–1412), queen regnant of Norway, regent of Denmark and Sweden, and founder of the Kalmar Union
 Margaret of Denmark (1456-1486), queen consort of Scotland